is a stop on the Setagaya Line by Tokyu Corporation and is located in Segataya, Tokyo, Japan.

Station layout
There are two side platforms on two tracks either side of a level crossing.

Surroundings
 Setagaya Castle Park
 Setagaya Gubernatorial Mansion
 Setagaya Ward City Hall
 Setagaya Ward Post Office
 Boro-ichi Street
 Tokyo Health Care University Setagaya Campus

History

The station opened on Jan 18, 1925.

References

Tokyu Setagaya Line
Stations of Tokyu Corporation
Railway stations in Tokyo